Belesbeneh (also Romanized as Balasbanah and Balasboneh; also known as Bālselboneh and Bilisi-Bene) is a village in Belesbeneh Rural District, Kuchesfahan District, Rasht County, Gilan Province, Iran. At the 2006 census, its population was 1,526, in 427 families.

References 

Populated places in Rasht County